Jassem Gaber Abdulsallam (born 20 February 2002) is a Qatari professional footballer who plays as a midfielder for Qatari club Al-Arabi and the Qatar national football team. He was selected for the 2022 FIFA World Cup.

Career
In January 2020, Gaber signed a four-year contract to remain with Al-Arabi until the 2024 season.

In January 2022, Gaber was included in the IFFHS AFC Under-20 Team of the Year for 2021.

References

External links
 

2002 births
Living people
People from Doha
Qatari footballers
Qatar youth international footballers
Association football defenders
Association football midfielders
Al-Arabi SC (Qatar) players
2022 FIFA World Cup players